The Wonderful World of the Brothers Grimm is a 1962 American fantasy film directed by Henry Levin and George Pal. The latter was the producer and also in charge of the stop motion animation. The film was one of the highest-grossing films of 1962. It won one Oscar and was nominated for three additional Academy Awards. Several prominent actors—including Laurence Harvey, Karlheinz Böhm, Jim Backus, Barbara Eden, and Buddy Hackett—are in the film.

It was filmed in the Cinerama process, which was photographed in an arc with three lenses, on a camera that produced three strips of film. Three projectors, in the back and sides of the theatre, produced a panoramic image on a screen that curved 146 degrees around the front of the audience.

Plot
The story focuses on the Grimm brothers, Wilhelm and Jacob, and is biographical and fantastical at the same time. They are working to finish a history for a local Duke, though Wilhelm is more interested in collecting fairy tales and often spends their money to hear them from locals. Tales such as "The Dancing Princess" and "The Cobbler and the Elves" are integrated into the main plot. One of the tales is told as an experiment to three children in a book store to see if publishing a collection of fairy tales has any merit. Another tale, "The Singing Bone", is told by an old woman in the forest who tells stories to children, while the uninvited Wilhelm secretly listens through an open window. The culmination of this tale involves a jeweled dragon and features the most involved usage of the film's special effects.

Wilhelm loses the manuscript of the Duke's family history while writing down this third story - he is supposed to be collecting additional information for the family history - and the brothers cannot meet their deadline. They are required to pay their rent, which was waived while they worked. As a result of wading through a stream in an effort to retrieve the manuscript (which fell into the water after his briefcase broke open), Wilhelm becomes critically ill with potentially fatal pneumonia. He dreams that at night various fairy tale characters come to him, begging him to name them before he dies. Wilhelm's fever breaks, and he recovers completely, continuing his own work while his brother publishes regular books, including a history of German grammar, a book on myths and legends, and a book on law. Jacob, shaken by his brother's experience, begins to collaborate on the fairy tales with Wilhelm.

They are ultimately invited to receive honorary membership at the Berlin Royal Academy, which makes no mention of the tales in their invitation. Jacob prepares to make a speech deliberately insulting the Academy for snubbing Wilhelm. As their train pulls into the station, hordes of children arrive, chanting, "We want a story". Wilhelm begins, "Once upon a time, there were two brothers". The children cheer, and the film ends with a caption card that reads "…and they lived happily ever after".

Cast
 Laurence Harvey - Wilhelm Grimm / The Cobbler ("The Cobbler and the Elves")
 Karlheinz Böhm - Jacob Grimm (as Karl Boehm)
 Claire Bloom - Dorothea Grimm
 Walter Slezak - Stossel
 Barbara Eden - Greta Heinrich
 Oskar Homolka - The Duke (as Oscar Homolka)
 Martita Hunt - Anna Richter (storyteller)
 Betty Garde - Miss Bettenhausen
 Bryan Russell - Friedrich Grimm
 Ian Wolfe - Gruber
 Walter Rilla - Priest
 Yvette Mimieux - The Princess ("The Dancing Princess")
 Russ Tamblyn - The Woodsman ("The Dancing Princess")/ Tom Thumb (in Wilhelm's dream)
 Jim Backus - The King ("The Dancing Princess")
 Beulah Bondi - The Gypsy ("The Dancing Princess")
 Terry-Thomas - Sir Ludwig ("The Singing Bone")
 Buddy Hackett - Hans ("The Singing Bone")
 Otto Kruger - The King at Ludwig's Trial ("The Singing Bone")
 Arnold Stang - Rumplestiltskin (in Wilhelm's dream)
 Stan Freberg, Thurl Ravenscroft and Dal McKennon - The Elves (Puppetoons voices) ("The Cobbler and the Elves") 
 Peter Whitney - The Giant (uncredited)
 Tammy Marihugh - Pauline Grimm
 Cheerio Meredith - Mrs. Von Dittersdorf
 Willy Reichert - Painter (uncredited)
 Gregory Morton - Michael Dantino

Production

Development
In the mid-1950s, George Pal left Paramount Studios, which had been his base for a number of years. In March 1956, he announced the formation of his own company, Galaxy Pictures, saying he would make six films, including an adaptation of The Time Machine written by David Duncan; Captain Cook, based on the novel Lost Eden; a film about Atlantis; and The Brothers Grimm, based on a script by David Harmon adapted from a biography of the brothers by Dr Hermann Gerstner. (Pal had bought the screen rights to Gerstner's biography in February 1956 and hired Harmon in March.)

Pal signed an agreement with MGM to finance Galaxy's slate, the first film produced being Tom Thumb (1958), based on a Grimm fairytale. In 1957, Pal announced he wanted Grimm to follow Tom Thumb with Alan Young and Eddie Bracken in the leading roles. In April 1958, he signed Mary Brown to do the costumes.

However, in May 1958, after discussions with MGM, Pal decided to make The Time Machine (1960) instead.

In August 1959, Pal announced that key roles would be played by Russ Tamblyn, Alan Young, and Yvette Mimieux. Tamblyn would make the film - which would be shot in Europe - after he got out of the army. In December 1959, Pal was reportedly seeking Bing Crosby for a lead role. That month, Stan Freberg was reportedly adding "special material" to the film.

In July 1960, Hedda Hopper reported that Pal would make the film in America, not Europe.

Pal then delayed the film again so that he could make Atlantis, the Lost Continent. In August 1960, it seemed the film would be postponed indefinitely when Pal announced he intended to make The Return of the Time Machine. However, that film was postponed (it would never be made) and, in January 1961, Pal announced Grimm would definitely be his next film.

Casting
Pal wanted to cast Peter Sellers and Alec Guinness as the brothers, but was over-ruled by the studio.

In March 1961, MGM reported Edmund Hartmann was working on the final script. In March 1961, Pal confirmed Alan Young would appear in the movie.

In April, Laurence Harvey was cast as William Grimm. The same month, Karl Boehm was cast as his brother with Yvette Mimieux to play his wife.

Mimieux wound up playing the dancing princess in the film while Barbara Eden was borrowed from 20th Century Fox to play Boehm's love interest.

In addition to playing the Woodsman, Russ Tamblyn also reprises his role as Tom Thumb, from Pal's 1958 film.

Cinerama
The Wonderful World of the Brothers Grimm was produced and exhibited in the original three-panel Cinerama widescreen process. MGM had signed a deal with Cinerama to make four films that attempted to tell a cohesive story, unlike previous productions, which had all been travelogues. How the West Was Won would be the first film and, in March 1961, MGM announced Grimm would be the second. (After these two  a single-lens Cinerama was used for narrative films.)

George Pal said three fairy tales were chosen which would look good in Cinerama. He also wanted to use lesser-known fairy tales so the audience did not know how they ended: The Dancing Princess, The Cobbler and the Elves and The Singing Bone.

Shooting
Pal left for Munich in April 1961, saying he will use "every trick in the books" in the film. "We hope to get some wonderful special effects especially."

Filming started 1 July 1961 (How the West Was Won started in June.) It took place on location in Bavaria, at Rothenberg and Dinkelsbuel. (Kassel, where the Grimms lived, had been bombed out.) After two months filming in Germany, the unit returned to Hollywood. Henry Levin directed the Grimm brothers sequences while Pal did the fairytale ones.

Reception

Box office
By September 1962, the film had been seen by a million people, 60% of them adults.

The Wonderful World of the Brothers Grimm grossed $8.9 million at the box office, earning $6.5 million in US theatrical rentals. It was the 13th highest-grossing film of 1962. Pal estimed the film needed to make at least $13 million to be profitable.

Critics
 "spectacularly beautiful scenic delights," the three stories have "enchanting, spellbinding moments . . . but also a tendency to drag," "lackluster depiction of the Grimm brothers' lives" - Ben Kubasik, Newsday
 "enchanting production," "the story itself will charm the hearts of the young-in-years-and-spirit," "the legends are imaginatively realized on the screen" - Kate Cameron, New York Daily News

Accolades
The film won an Oscar and was nominated for three more:
Won
 Best Costume Design, Color - Mary Wills
Nominated
 Best Art Direction-Set Decoration, Color - George Davis, Edward Carfagno, Henry Grace, Dick Pefferle (lost to John Box, John Stoll, and Dario Simoni for Lawrence of Arabia)
 Best Cinematography, Color - Paul C. Vogel (lost to Freddie Young for Lawrence of Arabia)
 Best Music, Scoring of Music, Adaptation or Treatment - Leigh Harline (lost to Ray Heindorf for The Music Man)

Legacy
Pal wanted to cast Laurence Harvey in the title role of his next film, 7 Faces of Dr. Lao, but wound up using Tony Randall instead.

Preservation status
Original high quality elements for the film are damaged and incomplete, and scattered among various international archives. The original negatives were left neglected with water damage and various other defects. Until 2022, it had been the only film originally shot in Cinerama to remain unrestored. The cost of a full digital scan and restoration of the best surviving elements was estimated by film preservationist Robert A. Harris at between $1 million to $2 million.

In an introduction to a Cinerama Holiday screening on 11 October 2020 at Pictureville, National Science and Media Museum in Bradford, then-ongoing digital restoration work of The Wonderful World of the Brothers Grimm was described, and snippets shown as well as the intention to have it ready for a digital Cinerama screening at the 2021 Widescreen Weekend festival in Bradford.  No film print had been planned up to that point due to the prohibitive cost.

Home media
MGM/UA Home Video released the film on VHS and LaserDisc in the U.S. in 1989 and 1992, respectively, and on LaserDisc in Japan in 1997. Since then, other than a bootleg Italian DVD from a low quality source, there have been no further releases on home media.

David Strohmeier announced a current restoration of this film, in collaboration with Warner Brothers and Cinerama, Inc.  Work began in November 2019. All the damaged elements were repaired and Strohmeier reports the resulting film looks like it was filmed yesterday. Restoration credit is shown over the exit music. The restoration was shown at the Museum of Modern Art on Jan 23, 2022. Warner Archive released the film on Blu-ray March 29, 2022 in a Deluxe 2-Disc Special Edition containing both Smilebox and letterbox versions (like the How the West Was Won Blu-ray).

Comic book adaptation
 Gold Key: The Wonderful World of the Brothers Grimm (October 1962)

See also
 List of American films of 1962
 The Brothers Grimm (2005)
 List of stop-motion films

References

External links
 
 
 
 
 
 Interview with Cinerama expert John Mitchell
 [The Wonderful World of the Brothers Grimm Cinerama trailer] "SmileBox" version, simulating the curved-screen effect

1962 films
1960s fantasy films
1960s biographical films
American children's fantasy films
American biographical films
1960s English-language films
Films directed by Henry Levin
Films with screenplays by Charles Beaumont
Biographical films about writers
1960s children's fantasy films
Cultural depictions of the Brothers Grimm
Films based on Grimms' Fairy Tales
Films directed by George Pal
Films produced by George Pal
Films set in Germany
Films set in the 1800s
Films set in the 1810s
Films shot in Bavaria
Films that won the Best Costume Design Academy Award
Films using stop-motion animation
Metro-Goldwyn-Mayer films
Musical films based on actual events
1960s stop-motion animated films
Films scored by Leigh Harline
Films adapted into comics
Films based on fairy tales
Films with screenplays by William Roberts (screenwriter)
1960s American films